Giovanni Maria Josse (Tolosa, 13 February 1815 - 12 June 1884) was an Italian composer and conductor. Better known by his French name Jean-Marie Josse while active in Paris during the 1840s and 1850s, at the end of his life he returned to Italy to stage his first opera.

Works
L'ermite, ou la tentation, oratorio fantastique en quatre parties Paris, 25 August 1848.
Le talisman, Théâtre de l'Opéra-Comique-Favart Paris 12 July 1850
La lega, opera after Henri III et sa cour by Alexandre Dumas. La Scala, Milan 25 January 1876

References

1815 births
1884 deaths